Viktoria Karpenko (born on March 15, 1981, in Kherson, Ukrainian SSR) is a World Championships silver medalist and 2000 Olympian in artistic gymnastics. She began gymnastics at the age of four and went on to become the Ukrainian National Champion in 1996.

Career
Karpenko made her world debut at the 1995 World Championships in Sabae, Japan with strong performances; however, she was overshadowed by veteran gymnasts and did not medal. Shortly after, she injured her hamstring and was unable to compete in the 1996 Olympic Games. The following year, she broke a finger during training and was forced to watch the 1997 World Championships from the stands.

In March 1998 she surprised coaches by winning the American Cup against U.S. hopefuls Vanessa Atler and Kristen Maloney. In April she placed second in the uneven bars final behind five-time world uneven bars champion Svetlana Khorkina at the European Championships. At the 1999 World Championships, Karpenko performed with ease and placed second in the all-around competition.

Things were looking great for Karpenko in early 2000, as she won preliminaries at the European Championships in Paris. Ending up third in the all-around, she also grabbed a silver on the uneven bars, and tied for another second-place finish on floor exercise in event finals. Despite these accomplishments, Karpenko is known for her performance at the 2000 Olympic Games, where she did not earn a medal. A favorite for the all-around title, Karpenko was in first place going into the final rotation. As she finished her first pass on floor, she stubbed her toe, tripped, and fell out of bounds. She subsequently received a score of 8.725 and dropped to 12th place.

Karpenko moved to Bulgaria in June 2002, where the country's Artistic Gymnastics Federation covered the costs for the treatment of her injury, and had two short-lived comebacks in both 2003 and 2006, competing for Bulgaria.  Marred by injury, she never retained her form or individual results. Her final competition was at the 2007 European Championships, where she placed 18th in the all-around.

In March 2012, China forfeited the 1999 World Championship team bronze medals to Ukraine, who placed fourth. It was discovered in 2008 that China falsified the age of team member Dong Fangxiao, therefore nullifying her results from this competition as well as the 2000 Olympics. Karpenko and her teammates received the bronze medal.

Competitive history

See also
List of Olympic female gymnasts for Ukraine

References

Gymnasts at the 2000 Summer Olympics
Medalists at the World Artistic Gymnastics Championships
Olympic gymnasts of Ukraine
Bulgarian female artistic gymnasts
Ukrainian female artistic gymnasts
1981 births
Living people
Sportspeople from Kherson